"Hit the Back" is a song by the American singer-songwriter King Princess released as the fourth pre-release single from her first studio album Cheap Queen. On Twitter, Straus claimed the song was "the anthem for bottoms everywhere".

Live performances
The song was performed on The Late Show with Stephen Colbert and Saturday Night Live on November 8 and November 23, 2019, respectively, alongside her other single "1950".

Remix
A remix by Channel Tres was released on January 17, 2020.

Personnel
Credits adapted from Tidal.
King Princess – vocals, songwriting, production, bass guitar, keyboards
Mark Malchicoff – production, recording engineer
Jonah Finegold – guitar
Emily Lazar – mastering engineer
Rob Kinelski – mixing engineer
Casey Cuayo – assistant engineer

References

2019 singles
King Princess songs
LGBT-related songs
2019 songs